John Allan Maling MC (13 February 1920 – 16 December 2012) was a soldier of the British Army during the Second World War who won the Military Cross for his action in Algeria. Ordered to defend a strategically important road junction, Maling and his platoon destroyed a number of German tanks and killed 40-50 of the enemy at a cost of only one casualty on their side. After the war he trained as a doctor at St Thomas's Hospital, and then worked as a general practitioner in Tunbridge Wells.

References 

1920 births
2012 deaths
British Army officers
British Army personnel of World War II
Recipients of the Military Cross
Military personnel from London
20th-century English medical doctors
Medical doctors from London
British general practitioners